Rugby Club Toulonnais, also known as RCT but usually Toulon) is a French professional rugby union club based in Toulon in Provence-Alpes-Côte d'Azur. A current participant in the first-tier Top 14 competition, they have won the national competition on four occasions.

Established in 1908, Toulon currently play their home games at the Stade Mayol, although they have begun to take high-profile matches to the 67,000-seat Stade Vélodrome in Marseille, playing one match there in 2008–09 and two in both 2009–10 and 2010–11. The club colours are red and black. Toulon were Pro D2 champions in 2005, but after finishing 14th in the 2005-06 Top 14 season, they were relegated back down. After signing a number of high-profile players, the club made a strong run at promotion in the 2006–07 season, and succeeded in their promotion quest in 2007–08, winning that season's Pro D2 crown with two rounds to spare. They struggled to avoid relegation for much of the 2008–09 Top 14 season, but a late-season surge brought them to ninth place and safety.

Their 2009–10 Top 14 season was more successful, with a second-place regular-season finish and a semi-final place domestically and a runner-up finish in the 2009–10 European Challenge Cup. In 2012, they again advanced to the Challenge Cup final, losing to Biarritz, and advanced to the Top 14 final, losing to Toulouse. In May 2013 Toulon won the 2013 Heineken Cup Final by 16–15 against Clermont Auvergne, and lost the Top 14 Final against Castres in June. They retained the Heineken Cup with a 23–6 win over Saracens in May 2014. They added a historic third consecutive win with a 24–18 win over Clermont in the 2015 final.

History
Rugby Club Toulonnais was founded on 3 June 1908 as a merger of Étoile Sportive Varoise and members of the Stade Varois, a club based in nearby La Seyne-sur-Mer. It took the club 23 years to reach the top of French rugby, when they won the 1931 championship against Lyon Olympique Universitaire (6–3, 2 tries to 1). The players were greeted by 30,000 people when they returned from Bordeaux, where the final had been held.

Toulon remained one of the top French clubs, but they lost four finals scattered over 35 years (1948, 1968, 1971 and 1985). The 1985 extra-time defeat by Stade Toulousain left them with many regrets, and playing a spectacular final (36–22) did nothing to alleviate the pain of losing. The Red and Black waited only two more years to finally lay their hands on the Bouclier de Brennus, as they defeated Racing at the Parc des Princes. The third title came in 1992, against Biarritz Olympique, in Serge Blanco's last match and last chance to win the title.

For eight years, Toulon were not particularly successful and were in heavy financial trouble (a 10 million franc deficit) forced the Ligue Nationale de Rugby to demote them to the Second Division in July 2000. The club missed an immediate return the next year, going down in the final to Montauban, as only one club was promoted that year. It took them five more years to do so as Toulon went on to win the Pro D2 title. But despite immense popular support (gates averaged more than 12,000), and much enthusiasm, they managed to win only three games out of 26 and were relegated after only a season.

Toulon signs star players
A new president, Mourad Boudjellal, a Toulonnais who made his fortune in the comic strip business, promised to build a huge team. He said: "I invented the Top 15, with a team that could be competitive in the Top 14". He signed a high number of first-class players, some of them well above 30, like Jean-Jacques Crenca, Yann Delaigue, Gonzalo Quesada and Dan Luger. He created buzz around the team as he managed to sign former All Blacks captain Tana Umaga, who arrived in Toulon right after the end of the Air New Zealand Cup on 26 October 2006. The contract was rumoured to be around €300,000 (£200,000), which Boudjellal claimed to pay from his own pocket, for only eight to ten matches. In a 2010 interview, Boudjellal would say about his decision to pursue Umaga, "It was incredible, because we were in the second division and I was speaking with the best player in the world. But he said yes and came to play with Toulon."

Boudjellal continued to sign high-profile veteran players, including  captain and former all-time international caps leader George Gregan, reportedly paid €400,000 out of Boudjellal's pocket, All Blacks' former all-time scoring leader Andrew Mehrtens, and Jonny Wilkinson.

Back in Pro D2 for the 2006–07 season, Toulon finish fourth in the league, putting them in the promotion playoffs for a place in the Top 14, but they lost in the promotion semi-finals 21–17 at La Rochelle. The following season Toulon headed the table from early on, never dropping from the top spot on their way to clinching promotion with two rounds to spare. The 2008–09 season proved to be one of consolidation. Umaga had been handed the coaching reins, but as Boudjellal would later say, "The first season in the Top 14 was very difficult and I learned that Tana Umaga was not yet ready to give up playing – and that he's not a manager." The team managed to survive that season, using a late-season surge to avoid a relegation scare. Toulon had a much more successful 2009–10 campaign, with Wilkinson leading the charge. He would be named the top fly-half of the year in France by leading rugby publication Midi Olympique, and would also be recalled to the England national team. Domestically, Toulon finished second on the league table, losing out to Perpignan for the top spot on a tiebreaker. This finish gave them a spot in the 2010–11 Heineken Cup, and also a first-round bye in that season's Top 14 playoffs. Toulon's domestic campaign ended in the semi-finals with a 35–29 extra-time loss to eventual champion Clermont in Saint-Étienne.

Toulon's 2009–10 Challenge Cup campaign proved more successful. They finished top of their pool and advanced to the knockout stage, crushing Scarlets 38–12 in the quarterfinals and surviving a hard-fought match against Connacht 19–12. Toulon got their preferred final venue of the Vélodrome on 23 May, where they lost to the Cardiff Blues 28–21, missing out on silverware for the season.

In May 2013 Toulon won the 2013 Heineken Cup Final by 16–15 against Clermont Auvergne.

Emblem
On the day of his arrival in Paris, on 1 May 1895, just before his first concert, Félix Mayol was met by a female friend at the station, who gave him some lily-of-the-valley, a flower people traditionally exchange on 1 May in France. He pinned it on his lapel, his concert was a success and Mayol, who was superstitious, made the lily-of-the-valley his personal emblem. It was taken up by the rugby club in 1921.

Stadium

In 1920, its stadium was inaugurated. It is named after Félix Mayol, a very popular concert hall singer from Toulon who had succeeded in Paris in the early 20th century. Shortly after World War I, he purchased what would be the stadium site and donated it to the club. It is one of the few French stadiums to be almost completely surrounded by the city and overlooks the Toulon bay and military harbour in the Mediterranean.

Charity cross-code matches

The club has played in cross-code charity matches with a half each of rugby union and football. On July 18th, 2013, they played Olympique de Marseille in the first ever match of the kind at the Stade Mayol to benefit a local charity with Marc Lièvremont and Eric Cantona as the referees in either half, with Olympique de Marseille winning 36–35. 

Two years later, the club played another such match to benefit a local children's charity at the Stade Mayol against France 98, the charity association team composed of France's 1998 FIFA World Cup winners, and won 33–26. Bernard Laporte served as one of the referees.

Honours
 Heineken Cup/European Rugby Champions Cup
 Champions (3): 2012–13, 2013–14, 2014–15
 Top 14
 Champions (4): 1930–31, 1986–87, 1991–92, 2013–14
 Runners-up (9): 1947–48, 1967–68, 1970–71, 1984–85, 1988–89, 2011–12, 2012–13, 2015–16, 2016–17
 Challenge Yves du Manoir
 Champions (2): 1934, 1970
 Runners-up (3): 1939, 1954, 1983
 Rugby Pro D2
 Champions (2): 2004–05, 2007–08
 Runners-up (1): 2000–01
 European Challenge Cup
 Runners-up (3): 2009–10, 2011–12, 2019–20

Finals results

Heineken Cup and European Rugby Champions Cup

French championship

Challenge Yves du Manoir

European Challenge Cup

Current standings

Current squad

The Toulon squad for the 2022–23 season is:

Espoirs squad

The RC Toulonnais Espoirs squad is:

Notable former players 

This is a list of former players in alphabetical order showing nationality and the period played for the club.

French

 Marc Andreu (2002–2009)
 Mathieu Bastareaud (2011-2019)
 Benjamin Bastères (2001–2011)
 Jean Berti
 Christian Califano (1990–1991)
 Christian Carrère
 Éric Champ (1979–1996)
 Jean-Jacques Crenca (2006–2007)
 Yann Delaigue (1988–1997, 2006–2007)
 Christophe Dominici (1993–1997)
 Jérôme Gallion (1975–1989)
 André Herrero
 Aubin Hueber (1991–2000, 2003–2006)
 Jean-Teiva Jacquelain “Academy” (2015-2017) - France 7s
 Benjamin Lapeyre (2010–2013)
 Jo Maso (1962–1964)
 Éric Melville
 Jacques Merquey
 Pierre Mignoni (1996–2000, 2009–11)
 Olivier Missoup (2008–2012)
 Marc de Rougemont (1991–1998) 
 Jean-Baptiste Rué (2006–2007)
 Thomas Sourice (2000–2012)
 Jean-François Tordo

International

 
 Felipe Contepomi
 Matias Cortese
 Juan Martín Fernández Lobbe
 Juan Martín Hernández
 Facundo Isa
 Esteban Lozada
 Gonzalo Quesada
 Nicolás Sánchez
 Leonardo Senatore
 Fotu Auelua
 Quade Cooper
 Rocky Elsom
 Matt Giteau
 George Gregan
 Matt Henjak
 Salesi Ma'afu
 Drew Mitchell
 James O'Connor
 Luke Rooney
 George Smith
 Jone Tawake
 Lachlan Turner
 Martin Jágr
 Delon Armitage
 Steffon Armitage
 Chris Ashton
 Kris Chesney
 Joe El-Abd
 Nick Kennedy
 Dan Luger
 Tom May
 Paul Sackey
 Dean Schofield
 Simon Shaw
 Matt Stevens
 Andrew Sheridan
 Jonny Wilkinson
 Sireli Bobo
 Sisa Koyamaibole
 Gabiriele Lovobalavu
 Semi Radradra
 Manasa Saulo
 Josua Tuisova
 Levan Chilachava
 Mamuka Gorgodze
 Davit Kubriashvili
 Konstantin Mikautadze
 Ilia Zedginidze
 Gia Labadze
 Akvsenti Giorgadze
 Damien Tussac
 Rob Henderson
 Paul O'Connell
 Martin Castrogiovanni
 Santiago Dellapè
 Ramiro Pez
 Ayumu Goromaru
 Christian Loamanu
 Jerry Collins
 Malakai Fekitoa
 Carl Hayman
 Chris Masoe
 Alby Mathewson
 Andrew Mehrtens
 Liam Messam
 Ma'a Nonu
 Anton Oliver
 Julian Savea
 Saimone Taumoepeau
 Tana Umaga
 Ali Williams
 Sonny Bill Williams
 Rudi Wulf
 Bakkies Botha
 Michael Claassens
 Eben Etzebeth
 Bryan Habana
 Juandré Kruger
 Victor Matfield
 JP Pietersen
 André Pretorius
 Danie Rossouw
 Lawrence Sephaka
 Juan Smith
 Marcel van der Merwe
 Joe van Niekerk
 Duane Vermeulen
 Lorne Ward
 Radu Demian
 Alin Petrache
 Alafoti Fa'osiliva
 Tusi Pisi
 Junior Polu
 David Smith
 Philip Fitzgerald
 Rory Lamont
 Makalea Foliaki(Academy)
 Jean-Teiva Jacquelain(Academy)
 Mafileo Kefu
 Samu Manoa
 Leigh Halfpenny
 Gavin Henson
 Gethin Jenkins
 Jamie Robinson

See also
 List of rugby union clubs in France
 Rugby union in France

References

External links
  RC Toulonnais Official website

 
Toulon
Toulon
Toulon
Sport in Toulon
1908 establishments in France